Henryk Władysław Niedźwiedzki (6 April 1933 – 9 February 2018) was an Olympic boxer from  Poland.

Niedźwiedzki was born in Bäreneiche, then Germany, now in Poland. He competed for Poland in the 1956 Summer Olympic Games held in Melbourne, Australia in the featherweight event where, as a losing semifinalist, he was a bronze medallist. Niedźwiedzki died after a protracted illness at the age of 84.

1956 Olympic results
Below are Henryk Niedźwiedzki's results from the 1956 Olympics in Melbourne, Australia where he competed as a featherweight boxer for Poland.

 Round of 32: bye
 Round of 16: defeated Leonard Leisching (South Africa) on points
 Quarterfinal: defeated Tristan Falfan (Argentina) by a first-round knockout
 Semifinal: lost to Vladimir Safronov (Soviet Union) on points (was awarded bronze medal)

References

 

1933 births
2018 deaths
Olympic boxers of Poland
Olympic bronze medalists for Poland
Boxers at the 1952 Summer Olympics
Boxers at the 1956 Summer Olympics
Olympic medalists in boxing
People from Człuchów County
Sportspeople from Pomeranian Voivodeship
Polish male boxers
Medalists at the 1956 Summer Olympics
People from Posen-West Prussia
Featherweight boxers
20th-century Polish people
21st-century Polish people